Michael Henry Crozier (8 June 1937 – 21 July 2012) was New Zealand politician and physicist. He was the fifth president of ACT New Zealand, a libertarian right-wing political party.

Crozier was elected as the ACT New Zealand president in March 2009, defeating Chris Simmons. Crozier resigned five months before his two-year term was to finish to take a long-planned trip to Europe with his wife. Chris Simmons was confirmed as the new president by the ACT New Zealand board on 21 October 2010.

Crozier had a PhD in physics, and was chief scientist at the Ministry of Defence. He died on 21 July 2012.

References

 Act plays down attempt on leadership, Published: 9:23PM Sunday December 20, 2009 Source: NZPA 
 John Armstrong: Act's silence wrong
 Hide denies forcing Act president to quit in row over critic

1937 births
2012 deaths
University of Canterbury alumni
New Zealand physicists
New Zealand public servants
ACT New Zealand politicians
New Zealand libertarians